Swan Lake Kispiox River Provincial Park is a provincial park in northwest British Columbia, Canada. It lies within the territories of the Gitanyow and Gitxsan First Nations. The park and the area surrounding it are important to First Nations people for cultural activities. There are trumpeter swans known to be on Club Creek in the winter.

In 1950, a B-36 crashed in the park after jettisoning a nuclear bomb.

References

Skeena Country
Provincial parks of British Columbia
Protected areas established in 1996
1996 establishments in British Columbia